Epieurybrachys is a monotypic moth genus in the family Epipyropidae described by Kato in 1940. Its sole species, Epieurybrachys eurybrachydis, was described by Thomas Bainbrigge Fletcher in 1920. It is found in India.

References

Epipyropidae
Monotypic moth genera
Zygaenoidea genera
Moths of Asia